The 2022–23 Basketball Championship of Bosnia and Herzegovina is 22nd season of this championship, with 13 teams from Bosnia and Herzegovina participating in it.

KK Igokea is the defending champion.

Teams and locations

Promotion and relegation 
Budućnost and Slavija were promoted, while Čelik was relegated.  

Radnik and Bratunac withdrew from the competition.

Clubs in European competitions

References 

Basketball Championship of Bosnia and Herzegovina
Bosnia
Bas